Luis Sequeira (born 8 January 2003) is an Argentine professional footballer who plays as a midfielder for San Lorenzo.

Professional career
Sequeira made his professional debut with San Lorenzo in a 3-0 Argentine Primera División win over Argentinos Juniors on 9 November 2019.

References

External links
 
 San Lorenzo Profile

2003 births
Living people
People from Escobar Partido
Argentine footballers
Argentina youth international footballers
Association football midfielders
San Lorenzo de Almagro footballers
Argentine Primera División players
Sportspeople from Buenos Aires Province